Carl John Rogers (born 20 October 1970 in Norwich) is an English cricketer who has represented Norfolk since 1990. He is a right-hand batsman who has appeared in 22 List A matches, 17 of these with Norfolk, scoring 524 runs at an average of 26.20 and with a best score of 139 not out coming against the Netherlands in 2001. He also bowls right-arm off-breaks.

Rogers was captain of Norfolk in 2009 and 2010.

Rogers played second XI cricket for Derbyshire, Essex and Sussex but has never played first-class cricket. In the Minor Counties Championship he has played 134 matches, scoring 8661 runs at 38.40 including 17 centuries.

Rogers was born in Norwich and attended Reepham High School. He is married and has two children.

References

External links
Norfolk County Cricket Club Profile

1970 births
Living people
English cricketers
Norfolk cricketers
Minor Counties cricketers
Cricketers from Norwich